The Belgian Cup is the national ice hockey cup in Belgium. It has been competed for since 1986.  It is currently competed for by the teams of the Belgian National League hockey league and by the lone Belgian team of the Dutch Eredivisie, HYC Herentals.  

The Belgian Cup is a separate tournament from the Belgian National Championship, which is awarded to the Belgian National League playoff winner.

Winners
 1986: HYC Herentals
 1987: not played
 1988: Phantoms Deurne
 1989: HYC Herentals
 1990: Griffoens Geel
 1991: HYC Herentals
 1992: Brussels Tigers
 1993: Phantoms Deurne
 1994: Olympia Heist op den Berg
 1995: HYC Herentals
 1996: Phantoms Deurne
 1997: Phantoms Deurne
 1998: Phantoms Deurne
 1999: HYC Herentals
 2000: HYC Herentals
 2001: Phantoms Deurne
 2002: Phantoms Deurne
 2003: HYC Herentals
 2004: White Caps Turnhout
 2005: Phantoms Deurne
 2006: IHC Leuven
 2007: White Caps Turnhout
 2008: White Caps Turnhout
 2009: White Caps Turnhout
 2010: Olympia Heist op den Berg
 2011: White Caps Turnhout
 2012: HYC Herentals
 2013: HYC Herentals
 2014: Bulldogs Luik
 2015: Phantoms Deurne
 2016: HYC Herentals
 2017: HYC Herentals
 2018: Bulldogs Luik
 2019: HYC Herentals
 2020: HYC Herentals

Ranking cup winners

External links 
 Royal Belgian Ice Hockey Federation

Cup
National ice hockey cup competitions in Europe